The 1988 Ladies European Tour was a series of golf tournaments for elite female golfers from around the world which took place in 1988. The tournaments were sanctioned by the Ladies European Tour (LET).

Tournaments
The table below shows the 1988 schedule. The numbers in brackets after the winners' names show the number of career wins they had on the Ladies European Tour up to and including that event. This is only shown for members of the tour. 

Major championships in bold.

See also
1988 LPGA Tour

References

External links
Official site of the Ladies European Tour

Ladies European Tour
Ladies European Tour
Ladies European Tour